Irina Ivenskikh (born July 22, 1972, Mirny, Arkhangelsk Oblast) is a Russian political figure and a deputy of the 8th State Duma. In 2019, she was awarded a Doctor of Sciences in Psychology degree.

From 2004 to 2015, she was the director of Lyceum No.10 in Perm. In 2009–2011, she served as Deputy Chairman of the Public Chamber of the Perm Oblast. From 2011 to 2015, she was a co-chairman of the Perm branch of the All-Russia People's Front. On December 4, 2011, she was elected deputy of the Legislative Assembly of Perm Krai. In 2015–2018, she was appointed Deputy Chairman of the Government of the Perm Krai. In January 2019, she became a co-chair of the regional branch of the All-Russia People's Front in Perm. She left the post in September 2021 when she was elected deputy of the 8th State Duma. On October 13, 2021, she was elected Chairman of the State Duma Committee on Education.

References

1972 births
Living people
United Russia politicians
21st-century Russian politicians
Eighth convocation members of the State Duma (Russian Federation)